Mizzi Günther (8 February 1879 – 18 March 1961) was a Bohemian-Viennese operetta soprano.

Günther was born in Warnsdorf, Bohemia (now the Czech Republic).  Her debut was in 1897 in Hermannstadt, now Sibiu, the part of the Austro-Hungarian Empire now in Romania.  She achieved stardom in Vienna in 1901 as O Mimosa San in The Geisha. She subsequently sang in England, France and Russia.

She created the title roles of Franz Lehár's The Merry Widow in 1905 and Leo Fall's Die Dollarprinzessin (1907), also appearing in the premieres of Fall's  (1908) and Emmerich Kálmán's Der kleine König (1912).  She died in Vienna, Austria, and is buried on the Zentralfriedhof.

Recordings
From 1903 to 1911, Günther recorded ten 78 rpm sides of music from The Merry Widow, Heinrich Reinhardt's Der liebe Schatz, Leo Ascher's Vergeltsgott and Franz Lehár's .

Sources
 Steane, J. B. (1992), "Günther, Mizzi" in The New Grove Dictionary of Opera, ed. Stanley Sadie (London)

External links

Mizzi Günther at Operetta Research Center

, 1906, first recording

1879 births
1961 deaths
People from Varnsdorf
Austrian operatic sopranos
Burials at the Vienna Central Cemetery
Austrian people of German Bohemian descent
19th-century Austrian women opera singers
20th-century Austrian women opera singers
Austro-Hungarian singers